The Canadian Human Rights Tribunal is an administrative tribunal established in 1977 through the Canadian Human Rights Act. It is directly funded by the Parliament of Canada and is independent of the Canadian Human Rights Commission which refers cases to it for adjudication under the act.

The tribunal holds hearings to investigate complaints of discriminatory practices and may order a respondent to a complaint to cease a practice, as well as order a respondent to pay compensation to the complainant.

Decisions of the Canadian Human Rights Tribunal are reviewable by Canada's Federal Court.  Federal Court decisions can then be appealed to the Federal Court of Appeal and the Supreme Court of Canada.  The Federal Court can also issue and enforce decisions made by the tribunal if violations continue and imprison an offender for contempt of court if a decision continues to be disregarded. This has happened in the cases of John Ross Taylor in 1981 and Tomasz Winnicki in 2006.

Justice Anne Mactavish was appointed Chair of the Canadian Human Rights Tribunal in 1998. On November 9, 2003, J. Grant Sinclair succeeded Mactavish as the Chair of the Tribunal. On September 10, 2009, Shirish P. Chotalia was appointed as his successor and served to 2012. Chotalia implemented Access to Justice through customized hearing procedures focussed on restorative justice; parties reported 94 per cent satisfaction. On September 2, 2014, David L. Thomas was appointed the Chair of the Tribunal for a seven-year term.

In June 2018, the Supreme Court of Canada found that the tribunal's determination that the Indian Act did not violate the Canadian Human Rights Act was reasonable due to judicial deference.

See also
Shiv Chopra
Freedom of expression in Canada
Human rights in Canada
Section 13 of the Canadian Human Rights Act
Universal Declaration of Human Rights

References

Access to Justice for Canadians—Customized Procedures

External links
Canadian Human Rights Tribunal

National human rights institutions
Federal departments and agencies of Canada
Human rights organizations based in Canada
1977 establishments in Canada
Canadian tribunals
Courts and tribunals established in 1977